WDUC (93.9 FM) is a radio station licensed to Lynchburg, Tennessee.  The station broadcasts a classic hits format and is owned by Peter Bowman, through licensee Bowman Broadcasting, LLC.

References

External links
WDUC's official website

DUC
Classic hits radio stations in the United States